Mortimer Beckett is a hidden-object type video game series that consists of five games. All the games are adventure games, or point and clicks.

The main plot is always to find items to advance to higher chapters. Also, there are items called "puzzle pieces" which
allow interaction with other characters, items, and animals. In the first two games, the objects are broken down into pieces and scattered throughout the different sections of chapters. In the third and fourth games the only difference is that pieces are not broken down, making it more like an I spy game.

As of 2013, all released games in this series have been ported to the iPad, and the first game has additionally been ported to Nintendo Wii.

Games

The games are:

- Mortimer Beckett and the Secrets of Spooky Manor, in which Mortimer helps his uncle to get rid of ghosts, by retrieving pieces of the Ghost Machine which have been hidden all over the manor. The cut scenes are 2D and read like a comic book.

- Mortimer Beckett and the Time Paradox, in which Mortimer has to travel through time to retrieve pieces of a timebomb that fell through a portal in his uncle's manor. The cut scenes are 2D, in which Mortimer falls into the next time zone.

- Mortimer Beckett and the Lost King, in which Mortimer wakes up from his final travel through the time portal from the Time Paradox game and learns he has to find the eight jewels of a powerful crown, with which he can locate the kingdom's lost king. The cut scenes are 3D, in which Mortimer walks towards the next scene.

- Mortimer Beckett and the Crimson Thief
Finally home after his journey, Mortimer resumes his simple life and peruses the daily newspaper. He finds that a mysterious figure named the Crimson Thief has been stealing valuable art pieces from all over the globe, while eluding the police at every turn.  Mortimer jumps on the case and is determined to find the stolen goods. Mortimer travels all over the world to recover stolen items: Paris, Rio de Janeiro, London and other destinations, looking for usable items, solving puzzles, and meeting and assisting the locals. At the end of the game, the song "Mickey" by Toni Basil is played with a cutscene in which Mortimer is dancing with cheerleaders.

- ''Mortimer Beckett and the Book of Gold
Released in 2017. In this game, Mortimer goes on another adventure, joining with Kate O'Malley of Delicious (game series).

Reception
The first game in the series had mixed reviews, according to Metacritic. Adan Ballard of IGN gave the game a 6.2/10, noting that "There's not a lot to Spooky Manor, but that doesn't stop it from being fun to play", while Francesca Dimola of Nintendo World Report rated it a 3/10 due to "a poor graphical presentation, and little-to-no replay value".

The fourth game was rated 3.5/5 by Gamezebo's Brandy Shaul, who criticized the story as being "shallow and under-developed", but praised the puzzles as being "challenging enough to be satisfying".

References

External links 
Mortimer Beckett Games List for PC, Mac and iPad

Video game franchises
Hidden object games